Armed and Dangerous is a 1977 Soviet western film. Based on the novel  Gabriel Conroy  and stories of Bret Harte.

Plot 
Events taking place at the end of the 19th century in the Wild West in America. The plot — the complex vicissitudes of life of hard workers — a prospector Gabriel Conroy. Having found oil on his land, he knows happiness and disappointment, and danger, and despair.

Cast
 Donatas Banionis as Gabriel Conroy, a prospector (voiced by Alexander Demyanenko).
 Mircea Veroiu as Jack Gemlin, professional gambler (voiced by Anatoly Kuznetsov)
 Lyudmila Senchina as Julie Prudhomme, the singer of cabaret
 Maria Ploae as Dolores Damphy (voiced by Valentina Talyzina)
 Leonid Bronevoy as Peter Damphy, entrepreneur
 Lev Durov as Lucky Charlie  
 Vsevolod Abdulov as Henry York, a young journalist
  Ferenc Bence as Harry, shooter (voiced by Nikolai Grabbe)
 Yan Shanilets as Julian Barreto
 Algimantas Masiulis as Starbottle (voiced by Yuri Sarantsev)
 Gregory Lampe as seller of secrets
Sergei Martinson as Mr. Trott
 Oleg Zhakov as Judge Flemming
 Talgat Nigmatulin as Joyce

Soundtrack 
Vladimir Vysotsky wrote seven texts for the film, three of which were put by the composer Firtich to music and performed by Lyudmila Senchina.

References

External links

1977 films
Gorky Film Studio films
Films based on short fiction
Films directed by Vladimir Vaynshtok
Films set in the 19th century
Ostern films
Soviet action films
Czechoslovak drama films
1977 Western (genre) films
Czech Western (genre) films
Romanian action films